Salvia semiatrata is a species of perennial plant native to the Sierra Madre del Sur in the Mexican state of Oaxaca, growing at elevations of  or higher. It prefers the edges of pine forests, and is also found on limestone cliffs and banks and in cactus scrub habitats that are dry and exposed.

The  deltoid leaves are a bright grassy green-yellow color, growing in small clusters even though they are opposite. The leaf surface is rugose, with the underside covered with short light cream-colored hairs that bring out the veining. The  inflorescences have whorls of one to three flowers in each verticil. The calyx is  inches long and covered with hairs, and is a rich violet color with magenta. The specific epithet semiatra refers to the corolla tube and its two colors.

Notes

semiatrata
Flora of Mexico